Soulivong Daravong (born 1 May 1949) is a Laotian politician and economist born in Xieng Khouang Province. He served as Minister of Planning and Investment of Laos. He studied engineering at Montreal University in Canada, graduating in 1974.

References

Living people
1949 births
Members of the 5th Central Committee of the Lao People's Revolutionary Party
Members of the 6th Central Committee of the Lao People's Revolutionary Party
Members of the 7th Central Committee of the Lao People's Revolutionary Party
Members of the 8th Central Committee of the Lao People's Revolutionary Party
Members of the 9th Central Committee of the Lao People's Revolutionary Party
Lao People's Revolutionary Party politicians
Laotian economists
Government ministers of Laos
Université de Montréal alumni
People from Xiangkhouang province